The 1913 Massachusetts gubernatorial election took place on November 4, 1913. Democratic Lieutenant Governor David I. Walsh defeated the Progressive, Republican and independent candidates Charles S. Bird, Representative Augustus Peabody Gardner and incumbent Governor Eugene Foss with 39.77% of the vote. Suffolk County was the only county to give more than 50% of its vote to a candidate and had given Walsh 53.98% of its vote.

Democratic primary

Candidates
David Walsh, Lieutenant Governor

Withdrew
Eugene Foss, incumbent Governor (running as an independent)

Results
Following Governor Foss's exit from the Democratic Party, Lieutenant Governor Walsh was unopposed for the nomination.

Republican primary

Candidates
Everett Chamberlin Benton, candidate for Governor in 1912
Augustus Peabody Gardner, U.S. Representative from Hamilton

Failed to qualify
Eugene Foss, incumbent Governor

Results

Progressive primary

Candidates
 Charles Sumner Bird, proprietor of Bird and Son Paper Company and nominee for Governor in 1912

Declined
Eugene Foss, incumbent Governor (running as an independent)

Results
Bird was unopposed for the nomination.

General election

Candidates
Charles Sumner Bird, proprietor of Bird and Son Paper Company and nominee for Governor in 1912 (Progressive)
Alfred H. Evans (Prohibition)
Eugene Foss, incumbent Governor of Massachusetts (Independent)
Augustus Peabody Gardner, U.S. Representative from Hamilton (Republican)
Arthur Reimer, candidate for President of the United States in 1912 (Socialist Labor)
David Walsh, Lieutenant Governor (Democratic)
George H. Wrenn (Socialist)

Results

Results by county

See also
 1913 Massachusetts legislature

References

1913 Massachusetts elections
1913
Massachusetts